Acer macrophyllum, the bigleaf maple or Oregon maple, is a large deciduous tree in the genus Acer.

It is native to western North America, mostly near the Pacific coast, from southernmost Alaska to southern California. Some stands are also found inland in the foothills of the Sierra Nevada of central California, and a tiny population occurs in central Idaho.

Description
The species' current national champion for size is located in Lane County, Oregon. The bark is gray brown, darkening and developing ridges with age.

In autumn, the leaves turn gold and yellow, contrasting against backdrops of evergreen conifers.
It is hermaphroditic, bearing both male and female flowers in each raceme. The flowers appear in early spring, before the leaves.
The fruit is a paired winged samara, each seed  in diameter with a  wing. Bigleaf maple begins bearing seed at about ten years of age.

In May 2018 the oldest two Oregon maples in Europe, 175 years old, were removed from Trinity College Dublin (TCD), Ireland. The first had an interior which was beginning to rot, and it fell after inclement windy weather. The second, also infected, was cut down as the same fate was expected. Both were in the adjoining grassy area which was originally the cemetery of All Hallows and is now the Front Square of TCD.

Chemical constituents 
The fallen leaves, blossoms, and seeds are concentrated with potassium, calcium, and other nutrients.

Distribution and habitat
Bigleaf maple can be found west of British Columbia's Coast Ranges and the Cascade Range, from Vancouver Island to California. It can form pure stands on moist soils in proximity to streams, but is generally found within riparian hardwood forests or dispersed, (under or within), relatively open canopies of conifers, mixed evergreens, or oaks (Quercus spp.) In cool and moist temperate mixed woods they are one of the dominant species. It is very rare north of Vancouver Island though cultivated in Prince Rupert, near Ketchikan, and in Juneau.

Ecology
The tree can live in a wide range of habitats, but thrives in fairly well-hydrated hardwood forests, occurring with red alder, black cottonwood, and willows. It is fairly shade tolerant, but not as much so as vine maple, and benefits from disturbances.
It is not considered to be fire-resistant due to its thin bark, but large trees with thick bark may survive moderate fires. Along with red alder, bigleaf maple often dominates early postfire succession in Douglas-fir forests, and fire can increase its forest presence. It spreads and grows vegetatively from cuttings and stumps of any size in a prolific manner.

Insects fertilize the tree's flowers. The winged fruits are eaten by squirrels, and by grosbeaks in the winter. Deer mice have been observed consuming bigleaf maple seeds in the spring in the Sierra Nevada. The foliage is browsed by ungulates such as black-tailed deer, mule deer, elk, and horses, as well as by mountain beavers and other rodents.

Bigleaf maple is preferred as habitat by the barred owl, and the presence of the tree is positively associated with Hammond's flycatchers.

In the wetter parts of its range, such as in the Olympic National Park and lowland forest around Puget Sound, the bark is often covered with epiphytes such as club moss and licorice fern.

Older trees suffer from heart rot.

Cultivars 
'Mocha Rose' — foliage in various shades of pink over growing season; red flowers
'Santiam Snows' — green leaves speckled with white
'Seattle Sentinel' — upright, columnar plant habit

Uses
Native Americans grew sprouts from the seeds for consumption, wove baskets from the inner bark, and used the leaves to cover food in cooking pits. They also carved the wood into dishes, utensils, and canoe paddles.

Maple syrup has been made from the sap of bigleaf maple trees. While the sugar concentration is about the same as in Acer saccharum (sugar maple), the flavor is somewhat different. Interest in commercially producing syrup from bigleaf maple sap has been limited. Although not traditionally used for syrup production, it takes about 40 volumes of sap to produce 1 volume of maple syrup.

Lumber
The bigleaf maple is the only commercially important maple of the Pacific Coast region.

The wood is primarily used in veneer production for furniture, but is also used in musical instrument production (including piano frames), interior paneling, and other hardwood products; the heartwood is light reddish-brown, fine-grained, moderately heavy, and fairly robust.

In California, land managers do not highly value bigleaf maples, and they are often intentionally knocked over and left un-harvested during harvests for Douglas fir and redwood stands.

Gallery

References

External links
 
 
 
 photo of herbarium specimen at Missouri Botanical Garden, collected in Yolo County, California, in 1903

macrophyllum
Trees of the Western United States
Natural history of the California chaparral and woodlands
Natural history of the California Coast Ranges
Natural history of the Peninsular Ranges
Plants described in 1813
Natural history of the Transverse Ranges
Garden plants of North America
Ornamental trees
Trees of North America
Trees of the West Coast of the United States
Trees of the United States
Trees of Canada
Trees of Western Canada